The -ary heap or -heap is a priority queue data structure, a generalization of the binary heap in which the nodes have  children instead of 2. Thus, a binary heap is a 2-heap, and a ternary heap is a 3-heap. According to Tarjan and Jensen et al., -ary heaps were invented by Donald B. Johnson in 1975.

This data structure allows decrease priority operations to be performed more quickly than binary heaps, at the expense of slower delete minimum operations. This tradeoff leads to better running times for algorithms such as Dijkstra's algorithm in which decrease priority operations are more common than delete min operations. Additionally, -ary heaps have better memory cache behavior than binary heaps, allowing them to run more quickly in practice despite having a theoretically larger worst-case running time. Like binary heaps, -ary heaps are an in-place data structure that uses no additional storage beyond that needed to store the array of items in the heap.

Data structure
The -ary heap consists of an array of  items, each of which has a priority associated with it. These items may be viewed as the nodes in a complete -ary tree, listed in breadth first traversal order: the item at position 0 of the array (using zero-based numbering) forms the root of the tree, the items at positions 1 through  are its children, the next  items are its grandchildren, etc. Thus, the parent of the item at position  (for any ) is the item at position  and its children are the items at positions  through . According to the heap property, in a min-heap, each item has a priority that is at least as large as its parent; in a max-heap, each item has a priority that is no larger than its parent.

The minimum priority item in a min-heap (or the maximum priority item in a max-heap) may always be found at position 0 of the array. To remove this item from the priority queue, the last item x in the array is moved into its place, and the length of the array is decreased by one. Then, while item x and its children do not satisfy the heap property, item x is swapped with one of its children (the one with the smallest priority in a min-heap, or the one with the largest priority in a max-heap), moving it downward in the tree and later in the array, until eventually the heap property is satisfied. The same downward swapping procedure may be used to increase the priority of an item in a min-heap, or to decrease the priority of an item in a max-heap.

To insert a new item into the heap, the item is appended to the end of the array, and then while the heap property is violated it is swapped with its parent, moving it upward in the tree and earlier in the array, until eventually the heap property is satisfied. The same upward-swapping procedure may be used to decrease the priority of an item in a min-heap, or to increase the priority of an item in a max-heap.

To create a new heap from an array of  items, one may loop over the items in reverse order, starting from the item at position  and ending at the item at position 0, applying the downward-swapping procedure for each item.

Analysis
In a -ary heap with  items in it, both the upward-swapping procedure and the downward-swapping procedure may perform as many as  swaps. In the upward-swapping procedure, each swap involves a single comparison of an item with its parent, and takes constant time. In the downward-swapping procedure, each swap involves  comparisons and takes  time: it takes  comparisons to determine the minimum or maximum of the children and then one more comparison against the parent to determine whether a swap is needed.

When creating a -ary heap from a set of n items, most of the items are in positions that will eventually hold leaves of the -ary tree, and no downward swapping is performed for those items. At most  items are non-leaves, and may be swapped downwards at least once, at a cost of  time to find the child to swap them with. At most  nodes may be swapped downward two times, incurring an additional  cost for the second swap beyond the cost already counted in the first term, etc. Therefore, the total amount of time to create a heap in this way is

The exact value of the above (the worst-case number of comparisons during the construction of d-ary heap) is known to be equal to:

,
where sd(n) is the sum of all digits of the standard base-d representation of n and ed(n) is the exponent of d in the factorization of n.
This reduces to
,
for d = 2, and to
,

for d = 3.

The space usage of the  heap, with insert and delete-min operations, is linear, as it uses no extra storage other than an array containing a list of the items in the heap. If changes to the priorities of existing items need to be supported, then one must also maintain pointers from the items to their positions in the heap, which again uses only linear storage.

Applications
When operating on a graph with  edges and  vertices, both Dijkstra's algorithm for shortest paths and Prim's algorithm for minimum spanning trees use a min-heap in which there are  delete-min operations and as many as  decrease-priority operations.

4-heaps may perform better than binary heaps in practice, even for delete-min operations. Additionally,
a -ary heap typically runs much faster than a binary heap for heap sizes that exceed the size of the computer's cache memory:
A binary heap typically requires more cache misses and virtual memory page faults than a -ary heap, each one taking far more time than the extra work incurred by the additional comparisons a -ary heap makes compared to a binary heap.

References

External links
C++ implementation of generalized heap with D-Heap support

Heaps (data structures)